In algebra, given a polynomial

They arise naturally in linear algebra as the characteristic polynomial of the inverse of a matrix.

In the special case where the field is the complex numbers, when

the conjugate reciprocal polynomial, denoted , is defined by,

A polynomial  is called self-reciprocal or palindromic if .
The coefficients of a self-reciprocal polynomial satisfy  for all .

Properties 
Reciprocal polynomials have several connections with their original polynomials, including:
 
 .
 If  then  is irreducible if and only if  is irreducible.
  is primitive if and only if  is primitive.

Other properties of reciprocal polynomials may be obtained, for instance:
 A self-reciprocal polynomial of odd degree is divisible by x+1, hence is not irreducible if its degree is > 1.

Palindromic and antipalindromic polynomials
A self-reciprocal polynomial is also called palindromic because its coefficients, when the polynomial is written in the order of ascending or descending powers, form a palindrome. That is, if
 

That is, a polynomial  is antipalindromic if .

Examples
From the properties of the binomial coefficients, it follows that the polynomials  are palindromic for all positive integers , while the polynomials  are palindromic when  is even and antipalindromic when  is odd.

Other examples of palindromic polynomials include cyclotomic polynomials and Eulerian polynomials.

Properties
 If  is a root of a polynomial that is either palindromic or antipalindromic, then  is also a root and has the same multiplicity.
 The converse is true: If a polynomial is such that if  is a root then  is also a root of the same multiplicity, then the polynomial is either palindromic or antipalindromic.
 For any polynomial , the polynomial  is palindromic and the polynomial  is antipalindromic.
 It follows that any polynomial  can be written as the sum of a palindromic and an antipalindromic polynomial, since .
 The product of two palindromic or antipalindromic polynomials is palindromic.
 The product of a palindromic polynomial and an antipalindromic polynomial is antipalindromic.
 If  is a palindromic polynomial of even degree 2, then there is a polynomial  of degree  such that .
 If an antipalindromic polynomial  has even degree  over a field  of odd characteristic, then its "middle" coefficient (of power ) is 0 since .

Real coefficients
A polynomial with real coefficients all of whose complex roots lie on the unit circle in the complex plane (that is, all the roots have modulus 1) is either palindromic or antipalindromic.

Conjugate reciprocal polynomials

A polynomial is conjugate reciprocal if  and self-inversive if  for a scale factor  on the unit circle.

This follows because

So  is a root of the polynomial  which has degree .  But, the minimal polynomial is unique, hence 

for some constant , i.e. . We conclude that .

Per Cohn's theorem, a self-inversive polynomial has as many roots in the unit disk  as the reciprocal polynomial of its derivative.

Application in coding theory

The reciprocal polynomial finds a use in the theory of cyclic error correcting codes. Suppose  can be factored into the product of two polynomials, say .
Also,  is self-orthogonal (that is, if and only if   divides .

See also 
Cohn's theorem

Notes

References

External links 
 
 Reciprocal Polynomial (on MathWorld)

Polynomials